Penelope Ann Forse, née Yule (born 7 May 1949) is a female retired British middle-distance runner.

Athletics career
Forse competed in the women's 1500 metres at the 1976 Summer Olympics without reaching the final. She finished seventh at the 1980 World Cross Country Championships, also winning a silver medal in the team competition. She represented England in the 3,000 metres event, at the 1978 Commonwealth Games in Edmonton, Alberta, Canada.

References

1949 births
Living people
Athletes (track and field) at the 1976 Summer Olympics
Athletes (track and field) at the 1978 Commonwealth Games
British female middle-distance runners
Olympic athletes of Great Britain
Sportspeople from Chichester
Commonwealth Games competitors for England